KORU, (89.9 FM) branded as Joy FM is a radio station licensed to Garapan, Saipan, Northern Mariana Islands. The station is currently owned by Good News Broadcasting Corporation, and simulcasts the signal from KSDA-FM.

References

External links
 

ORU
Garapan
Seventh-day Adventist media
Seventh-day Adventist Church in Oceania